Lisa Read (born 26 August 1973) is an Australian gymnast. She competed in six events at the 1992 Summer Olympics.

References

External links
 

1973 births
Living people
Australian female artistic gymnasts
Olympic gymnasts of Australia
Gymnasts at the 1992 Summer Olympics
Place of birth missing (living people)
Commonwealth Games medallists in gymnastics
Commonwealth Games silver medallists for Australia
Gymnasts at the 1990 Commonwealth Games
20th-century Australian women
Medallists at the 1990 Commonwealth Games